The Channel 7 or Channel 7 HD, fully known as Bangkok Broadcasting & Television Company Limited Channel 7, is a Thai free-to-air television network that was launched on 27 November 1967. It is the first colour television broadcast in Mainland Southeast Asia. It is currently owned by the Royal Thai Army through Bangkok Broadcasting & Television. Its headquarters are located in Mo Chit, Chatuchak, Bangkok.

History

The channel was launched in a ceremony on 27 November 1967 at 7:00 pm Bangkok Time. It was presided over by the then Prime Minister of Thailand Field Marshal Thanom Kittikachorn. The first programme to air was the 1967 Miss Thailand Pageant. Channel 7 was known back then as "Bangkok Colour Television Network", airing on channel 5 and was the country's first colour television station using PAL Colour. On 1 January 1972, it started broadcasting nationwide. In 1974 it switched frequencies to UHF Channel 7, swapping with Royal Thai Army Television.

Channel 7 launched its high-definition television feed on 25 April 2014 on its digital terrestrial television system (DTT) on channel 35. Three years later, on 19 June 2017, Channel 7 was given authorisation from the National Broadcasting and Telecommunications Commission to shut down its analogue frequencies in the rest of the country, in order to replace them with its digital channels on DTT. Thus, the network was expected to stop broadcasting on analogue 1 January 2018, but the process was postponed to 16 May 2018 and eventually completed on 16 June.

Programming

Notable sports
 Channel 7 Boxing Stadium
 Fairtex Fight Promotion

PBS Kids 
 Clifford the Big Red Dog (Upcoming)

See also 
Television in Thailand

References

External links

Television stations in Thailand
Television channels and stations established in 1967
Mass media in Bangkok